Joel Western (born 12 October 2002) is an Australian rules football player who plays for the Fremantle Football Club in the Australian Football League (AFL).

A member of Fremantle's Next Generation Academy (NGA), as his mother was born in Singapore, Western was drafted with the 54th selection in the 2020 national draft, when Fremantle matched the Western Bulldogs's bid. He had played junior football for Claremont and represented Western Australia at Under 18 level. His father John, also played football for Subiaco in the 1980s and his sister Mikayla Western plays for the West Coast Eagles, having previously played one game for Fremantle in the AFL Women's league in 2022 as a COVID-19 top-up player.

He was selected to make his AFL debut for Fremantle in round 13 of the 2021 AFL season against Gold Coast, alongside fellow 2020 draftee and NGA member, Brandon Walker.

Following the conclusion of the 2022 season Fremantle Football Club played four AFL games for the club.

Statistics
 Statistics are correct to the end of round 10, 2022

|- style="background-color: #EAEAEA"
! scope="row" style="text-align:center" | 2021
|
| 34 || 4 || 0 || 0 || 14 || 11 || 25 || 5 || 6 || 0.0 || 0.0 || 3.5 || 2.8 || 6.3 || 1.3 || 1.5
|-
! scope="row" style="text-align:center" | 2022
|
| 34 || 0 || – || – || – || – || – || – || – || – || – || – || – || – || – || –
|- class="sortbottom"
! colspan=3| Career
! 4
! 0
! 0
! 14
! 11
! 25
! 5
! 6
! 0.0
! 0.0
! 3.5
! 2.8
! 6.3
! 1.3
! 1.5
|}

Notes

References

External links

 
WAFL player profile

2002 births
Living people
Fremantle Football Club players
Peel Thunder Football Club players
Australian rules footballers from Western Australia
Australian people of Singaporean descent